Margarita Stepanenko (previously Azizova, born 25 April 1993) is a Ukrainian-born Azerbaijani volleyball player who plays as opposite for Azerrail Baku. She is a member of Azerbaijan national team and was part of the squad at the 2015, 2019 and 2021 editions of the European Championship.

Clubs
  Telekom Baku (2012-2017)
  Beşiktaş (2017-2018)
  PTPS Piła (2018-2019)
  Radomka Radom (2019-2020)
  Minchanka Minsk (2020-2021)
  Panathinaikos (2021-2022) 
  Azerrail Baku (2022-present)

References

External links
 VFU Profile
 Volleybox profile
 CEV profile

Living people
Ukrainian women's volleyball players
Azerbaijani women's volleyball players
Ukrainian emigrants to Azerbaijan
Naturalized citizens of Azerbaijan
1993 births